Polina Edmunds (born May 18, 1998) is a retired American figure skater. She is the 2015 Four Continents champion, the 2014 CS U.S. Classic champion, and a two-time U.S. national silver medalist (2014, 2016). She represented the United States at the 2014 Winter Olympics in Sochi, finishing 9th.

Earlier in her career, Edmunds won two ISU Junior Grand Prix events and the 2013 U.S. National Junior title. Edmunds was in skates by two, in lessons by four.

Personal life 
Polina Edmunds was born on May 18, 1998, in Santa Clara, California. Her mother, Nina, is a figure skating coach and former figure skater originally from Tver, Russia, who learned how to coach under Alexei Mishin. Her father, John Edmunds, is CFO of a computer software company. She has two brothers—James, who is two years older, and Daniel, four years younger—both of whom play hockey. Olympic ice dance champions, Marina Klimova and Sergei Ponomarenko, are the godparents of her brother, Daniel. In 2007, Edmunds began taking ballet and jazz lessons at Dance Theatre International in Evergreen, San Jose when she was eight. She was a student at Archbishop Mitty High School and graduated in May 2016. She began studying communication at Santa Clara University in September 2016. She was a member of Santa Clara's chapter of Delta Gamma.

Career 
Edmunds first stepped onto the ice at twenty months old and was taking lessons in both skating and ballet by age four. She cites Carolina Kostner, Sasha Cohen, and Michelle Kwan as her figure skating role models. She trained at the Sharks Ice Rink in San Jose with longtime coaches David Glynn and Nina Edmunds, her mother, who have both coached her since she was four.

Early career
Edmunds placed seventh on the junior level at the 2011 U.S. Championships and then sixth in 2012. In the 2012–2013 season, she won the U.S. national junior title at the 2013 U.S. Championships. Having received no ISU Junior Grand Prix assignments, Edmunds' only remaining opportunity to get on the ISU's Season's Best or World Standing lists—and thus, have a chance of a senior Grand Prix assignment in the following season—was the 2013 World Junior Championships. U.S. Figure Skating decided not to give her one of the three ladies' spots to World Juniors and instead sent her to the 2013 Gardena Spring Trophy, where she won the junior gold medal. It did not count for either list.

2013–2014 season: Sochi Olympics

In mid-2013, Edmunds began receiving coaching from Frank Carroll in addition to David Glynn and Nina Edmunds. She received her first ISU Junior Grand Prix (JGP) assignments in the 2013–14 season; she placed first in both segments on her way to the gold medal in Mexico City, her debut. Edmunds received another gold medal at the JGP in Belarus, after placing second in the short and first in the free. At the Junior Grand Prix Final in Fukuoka, Japan, she had trouble in the short program, placing fifth, but was second in the free skate and finished fourth overall.

Edmunds competed on the senior level for the first time at the 2014 U.S. Championships. She won the silver medal behind Gracie Gold after placing second in both segments of the competition. On January 12, Edmunds was named to the U.S. team for the Olympics and Worlds. Making her senior international debut, she finished ninth with a total score of 183.25 at the Winter Olympics in Sochi, Russia after placing seventh in the short program and ninth in the free skate. A month later, Edmunds competed at the 2014 World Championships in Saitama, Japan. She placed twelfth in the short program but moved up after placing fifth in the free skate, finishing eighth overall with a score of 187.50.

2014–2015 season: Four Continents title
Edmunds began her season with gold at the 2014 U.S. International Classic, an ISU Challenger Series event. She was assigned to two Grand Prix events, the 2014 Cup of China and 2014 NHK Trophy. At her senior Grand Prix debut, Edmunds finished fourth in China and eighth in Japan.

At the 2015 U.S. Championships, Edmunds placed third in the short program but fourth in the free skate, finishing fourth overall. She won the pewter medal behind bronze medalist Karen Chen. However, Chen was not age-eligible to go to the World Championships, so Edmunds was named to both Four Continents and World teams.

Edmunds won gold at the 2015 Four Continents after placing fourth in the short program and first in the free skate.

At the 2015 World Championships, Edmunds placed seventh in both segments of the competition, finishing eighth overall.

2015–2016 season
Edmunds was assigned to compete at the 2015 Skate Canada International and 2015 Rostelecom Cup. She finished sixth in Canada and fourth in Russia. She won the silver medal behind Gracie Gold at the 2016 U.S. Championships, after placing first in the short program  and second in the free. She withdrew from the 2016 Four Continents Championships because she lacked time to break in new skates. The old pair of skates, which she had worn for two years, were too soft to be used.

In February 2016, an MRI showed that Edmunds had a bone bruise on the navicular bone in her right foot, an injury which arose after she "started jumping too early in the new skates". As a result, she withdrew from the 2016 World Championships in Boston.   After a break, she resumed skating but the problem resurfaced in June; she decided to limit herself to off-ice training for a month and then returned to the ice.

2016-2020: Injuries 
Edmunds resumed skating in August 2016 but paused her training in November after the bone bruise returned; she was concerned about the possibility of a career-ending fracture in the navicular bone. She withdrew from her two Grand Prix competitions, the 2016 Rostelecom Cup and 2016 NHK Trophy. In January 2017, she withdrew from the U.S. Championships. Edmunds returned to the ice in March 2017.

Edmunds qualified to the 2018 U.S. Figure Skating Championships in her hometown of San Jose. She skated a strong short program, though with reduced technical difficulty, and finished 7th. During the practice session before the free program, Edmunds felt a shooting pain in her foot and withdrew from the free program, fearing her previous navicular bone injury had returned.

Edmunds did not compete during the 2018–2019 season due to a bone bruise on her right foot. She told Nick Zaccardi of NBC Sports: "The bone bruise that I had was very deep and very serious for such a small bone in my foot. It required a lot of time off the ice, off really physical activity impact on my foot to really heal it properly." Edmunds missed out on qualifying for the 2020 U.S. Figure Skating Championships after placing fifth at the Pacific Coast Sectionals.

Retirement
On July 15, 2020, Edmunds stated in an interview that she left competitive skating and was looking forward to other opportunities in skating and her career. She mentioned that she was proud of her accomplishments and if it had not been for the COVID-19 pandemic, she would have been in a full training mode for the season.

Programs

Competitive highlights 
GP: Grand Prix; CS: Challenger Series; JGP: Junior Grand Prix

2012–13 to present

2007–08 to 2011–12

Detailed results
Small medals for short and free programs awarded only at ISU Championships. Pewter medals for fourth-place finishes awarded only at U.S. national and regional events.

References

External links 

 Official site
 
 Polina Edmunds at IceNetwork.com

1998 births
American female single skaters
Living people
Sportspeople from Santa Clara, California
American people of Russian descent
Figure skaters from San Jose, California
Figure skaters at the 2014 Winter Olympics
Olympic figure skaters of the United States
Four Continents Figure Skating Championships medalists
Santa Clara University alumni
21st-century American women